Sissili is one of the 45 provinces of Burkina Faso, located in its Centre-Ouest Region. In 2006 the population was 212,628 and in 2011 the population was 240,830, an increase of 13.3%.

Its capital is Léo.

Education
In 2011 the province had 194 primary schools and 18 secondary schools.

Healthcare
In 2011 the province had 31 health and social promotion centers (Centres de santé et de promotion sociale), 3 doctors and 65 nurses.

Departments
Sissili is divided into 7 departments:

See also
Regions of Burkina Faso
Provinces of Burkina Faso
Departments of Burkina Faso

References

 
Provinces of Burkina Faso